Baboon (Danish: Bavian) is a 2006 short story collection by Danish author Naja Marie Aidt. It was translated into English by Denise Newman in 2014.

Awards and honours
2007 Danish Critics Prize for Literature 
2008 Nordic Council's Literature Prize
2015 PEN Translation Prize
2015 Best Translated Book Award, longlist

References

2006 short story collections
Danish short story collections
Nordic Council's Literature Prize-winning works